Bayu Aji (born 31 January 2000) is an Indonesian professional footballer who plays as a defender for Liga 1 club Arema.

Early life
Bayu was born in Malang and joined the youth academy of Bali United Youth as a youth player.

Club career 
Bayu joined a Liga 1 club Arema on 21 January 2023 after trialing. Before, Bayu joined NZR Sumbersari.

References

Football in Indonesia
Footballers in Indonesia
Liga 1 (Indonesia) players
Indonesian footballers
Arema F.C. players